Bahçederesi is a village in the Silifke district of Mersin Province, Turkey. At  it is situated in the southern slopes of the Taurus Mountains. The population of Bahçederesi is 164 as of 2020.

References

Villages in Silifke District